Hul is a municipality and village in the Nové Zámky District in the Nitra Region of south-west Slovakia.

History
In historical records the village was first mentioned in 1290.

Geography
The village lies at an altitude of 124 metres and covers an area of 12.624 km². It has a population of about 1240 people.

Ethnicity
The population is about 99% Slovak.

Facilities
The village has a public library.

Genealogical resources

The records for genealogical research are available at the state archive "Statny Archiv in Nitra, Slovakia"

 Roman Catholic church records (births/marriages/deaths): 1737-1895 (parish B)

See also
 List of municipalities and towns in Slovakia

External links
https://web.archive.org/web/20070513023228/http://www.statistics.sk/mosmis/eng/run.html
Hul – Nové Zámky Okolie
Surnames of living people in Hul

Villages and municipalities in Nové Zámky District